Pious fraud is used to describe fraud in religion or medicine. A pious fraud can be counterfeiting a miracle or falsely attributing a sacred text to a biblical figure due to the belief that the "end justifies the means", in this case the end of increasing faith by whatever means available.

Use of the phrase
The Oxford English Dictionary reports the phrase was first used in English in 1678. Edward Gibbon was particularly fond of the phrase, using it often in his monumental and controversial work The History of the Decline and Fall of the Roman Empire in which he criticized the likelihood of some of the martyrs and miracles of the early Christian church.

William W. Howells wrote that shamans know that their tricks are impostures, but that all who studied them agree that they really believe in their power to deal with spirits. According to Howells, their main purpose is an honest one and they believe that this justifies the means of hoodwinking his followers in minor technical matters.

Thomas Jefferson

Thomas Jefferson wrote to a friend and doctor in 1807:

Isaac Newton
In Isaac Newton's dissertation, An Historical Account of Two Notable Corruptions of Scripture, he blames the "Roman Church" for many abuses in the world, accusing it of "pious frauds".

See also
 Faith healing
 Noble lie
 Pious fiction
 Religious fraud

References

External links
 Pious fraud entry at skeptic dictionary

Fraud
Religious practices